This Is Me Now is Swedish singer Amy Diamond's first studio album. It was released on 18 May 2005 by Bonnier Amigo Music Group. Four singles were released from the album, the most successful being "What's in It for Me", which topped the charts in Sweden and Norway and peaked within the top 10 in Denmark and Finland. "Welcome to the City" also experienced success in Sweden, reaching number three, but follow-ups "Champion" and "Shooting Stars" failed to chart.

Track listing
 "Hello!"
 "What's in It for Me"
 "Welcome to the City"
 "Another Day"
 "One of the Ones"
 "Shooting Star*"
 "Champion"
 "Go!"
 "If I Ain't Got You (Live)"
 "Tomorrow (Annie's Song)"
 "What's in It for Me (Video)"

Track listing (international version)
 "Hello!"
 "What's in It for Me"
 "Welcome to the City"
 "Another Day"
 "Don't Lose Any Sleep over You"
 "Shooting Star"
 "All the Money in the World"
 "Champion"
 "Go!"
 "If I Ain't Got You (Live)"
 "One of the Ones"
 "What's in It for Me (Glasperlenspieler Mix)"
 "What's in It for Me (New Video)"

Charts

Weekly charts

Year-end charts

References

2005 albums
Amy Deasismont albums